Lios na gCearrbhach refers to:

 The Irish name of the town of Lisburn, Northern Ireland
 The Irish form of Lisnagarvey, the townland where Lisburn is situated